Waiting for Bonaparte is the third studio album by The Men They Couldn't Hang. It was recorded at Woodcray Studios in Berkshire and was released in 1988. It is the first album to feature Ricky McGuire (ex UK Subs) on bass guitar. The album again features songs written about British culture and history. The only single on the album to feature a promotional video was The Colours. The video was given a Les Miserables style theme due to its historical lyrical content and features writer Paul Simmonds in drag playing the part of a woman of ill repute. The song itself, however was banned by the BBC due to the line, "You've come here to watch me hang!", which echoed the events happening in South African townships at the time, in particular the plight of the Sharpeville Six. The song told the story of the1797 Nore mutiny and the execution of Richard Parker for his role in the mutiny. Despite the ban it still managed to reach number 61 in the UK singles chart. The Crest is the only single to have an extended remixed version. This was less successful only reachin number 94 in the UK singles chart. Initial vinyl LP copies were a limited edition which came with a song book of lyrics and guitar tabs as well as a poster.

Personnel

The Men They Couldn't Hang
 Stefan Cush (a.k.a. Cush) – vocals, guitar, horn
 Ricky McGuire - bass guitar
 Jon Odgers – drums, percussion
 Philip Odgers (a.k.a. Swill) – vocals, guitar, recorder
 Paul Simmonds - guitar, bouzuki, mandolin, lute

Additional musicians
 Lindsey Lowe and Graham Ashton – trumpet
 Bobby Valentino – violin
 Stephen Shaw - pipe
 Stephen Wick - tuba

Producer and engineer
 Mick Glossop

Track listing

References

1988 albums
The Men They Couldn't Hang albums